Line 11 (Coral) (formerly Line E (Orange), is a line of the Companhia Paulista de Trens Metropolitanos (CPTM) system in São Paulo, Brazil.

The section between stations Luz and Guaianases was completely modernized in late '90s, when many stations parallel to Line 3 - Red were closed. Since then, this part of the Line 11 - Coral is also known as the East Express (Portuguese: Expresso Leste). After the modernized section was opened in May 2000 the line was divided into two sections, and passengers were required to switch trains to proceed. Since April 2019 the line is once again unified, but in rush hours additional trains might travel between Luz and Guaianases only in order to increase seat availability to the most demanding stations.

As of April 2019, about 752,800 passengers use Line 11 - Coral each business day, with a headway of 4 minutes during hush hours and 8 minutes off-peak.

Stations

Notes

References

External links

Official page of the CPTM 
Secretaria dos Transportes Metropolitanos 

Companhia Paulista de Trens Metropolitanos
CPTM 11